Anton Kravchenko (born 23 March 1991) is a professional Ukrainian football defender, who plays in the Nemzeti Bajnokság I club Kisvárda.

His brother Kostyantyn Kravchenko is also a football player.

External links 
Profile on Official Dnipro Website
 
 Soccerway Profile

1991 births
Living people
Footballers from Dnipro
Ukrainian footballers
FC Dnipro players
FC Naftovyk-Ukrnafta Okhtyrka players
FC Volyn Lutsk players
FC Helios Kharkiv players
FC Tytan Armyansk players
FC Stal Kamianske players
Kardemir Karabükspor footballers
Ukrainian expatriate footballers
Expatriate footballers in Turkey
Ukrainian expatriate sportspeople in Turkey
Ukrainian Premier League players
Ukrainian First League players
Süper Lig players
Association football defenders
FC Olimpik Donetsk players
Balmazújvárosi FC players
Kisvárda FC players
Expatriate footballers in Hungary
Ukrainian expatriate sportspeople in Hungary